Xenorhina rostrata is a species of frog in the family Microhylidae.
It is found in West Papua in Indonesia and Papua New Guinea.
Its natural habitats are subtropical or tropical moist lowland forests, subtropical or tropical moist montane forests, rural gardens, and heavily degraded former forest.

Names
It is known as gwnm in the Kalam language of Papua New Guinea, a name that is also applied to Cophixalus riparius.

References

Xenorhina
Amphibians of New Guinea
Taxonomy articles created by Polbot
Amphibians described in 1898